Alan Chambers  (born 15 October 1947) is a politician from Northern Ireland. Since the 2016 election he has served as an Ulster Unionist Party (UUP) MLA for North Down.
 

Chambers was elected to North Down Borough Council in a by-election on 17 April 1991 as an Independent, representing the Ballyholme and Groomsport electoral area. He was re-elected in several subsequent elections, topping the poll in the elections of 1993, 1997 and 2001, and elected as the second candidate in 2005 and 2011. He served as Mayor of North Down for the 2000–2001 term. Following the abolition of North Down council, Chambers was elected to the successor council of North Down and Ards at the 2014 elections, topping the poll in the Bangor East and Donaghadee area.

Chambers contested the 1995 Westminster by-election in North Down, finishing fourth with 8% of the vote.

At the 1996 Northern Ireland Forum elections, Chambers headed his own Independent Chambers list. However, the list was unsuccessful, polling 567 votes (0.08%) across Northern Ireland, with Chambers receiving the majority of these in North Down, representing 1% of the total vote in that constituency. He contested North Down as an independent at each subsequent Assembly election, receiving 3.7% of first preferences in 1998, 3.5% in 2003, 3.7% in 2007 and 6.3% in 2011.

In December 2015, Chambers joined the UUP and was elected to the Northern Ireland Assembly at the 2016 election. 

He stood for the North Down constituency in the 2019 General Election for the UUP, finishing third with 12.1% of the vote. He currently represents the UUP on the Health Committee in the Assembly and is the party spokesperson on Health. He also served as a member of the NI Policing Board between December 2018 and June 2020.

References

External links
Northern Ireland Assembly profile
Ulster Unionist Party profile

1947 births
Living people
Politicians from Belfast
Ulster Unionist Party MLAs
Northern Ireland MLAs 2016–2017
Northern Ireland MLAs 2017–2022
Mayors of places in Northern Ireland
Members of North Down Borough Council
Northern Ireland MLAs 2022–2027